Sebastián Keitel Bianchi (born February 14, 1973, in Santiago) is a Chilean ex-sprinter who competed mostly in the 200 metres. He was coached by renowned Chilean coach Pedro Soto Acuña.

Biography

Sebastián Keitel comes from an athletics family, his father Alberto Keitel, was a sprinter in the 1960s, his grandmother, María Cristina Böcke was the South American discus throw champion in 1939.

He has been successful at the regional level, and won a bronze medal at the 1995 World Indoor Championships. He currently holds the national records of Chile in the 100 metres (10.10) and the 200 metres (20.15). He was considered at the time to be the fastest white man in the world in the 200 meter dash.

Political career
After his retirement, Keitel announced that he would run as a candidate for the Chamber of Deputies of Chile for the 2017 Chilean general election, as an independent affiliated with Political Evolution.

Personal life 
He was married to a former Chilean sprinter, Lisette Rondón. Their son, Sebastián Keitel Rondón, is also a promising athlete. Elisa Keitel Rondón, Olimpia Keitel Ossa and Ema Keitel Ossa.

Keitel is a practicing Roman Catholic, has German, Italian, Swedish and Danish ancestry.

International competitions

Personal bests
100 metres - 10.10 (1998)
200 metres - 20.15 (1998)

References

sports-reference

1973 births
Living people
Chilean male sprinters
Chilean people of German descent
Chilean people of Swedish descent
Chilean people of Italian descent
Chilean people of Danish descent
Chilean Roman Catholics
People from Valdivia
Athletes (track and field) at the 1996 Summer Olympics
Athletes (track and field) at the 1995 Pan American Games
Athletes (track and field) at the 1999 Pan American Games
Olympic athletes of Chile
Pan American Games bronze medalists for Chile
Colegio del Verbo Divino alumni
Pan American Games medalists in athletics (track and field)
Evópoli politicians
South American Games gold medalists for Chile
South American Games silver medalists for Chile
South American Games medalists in athletics
Competitors at the 1994 South American Games
Chilean sportsperson-politicians
Members of the Chamber of Deputies of Chile
World Athletics Indoor Championships medalists
Competitors at the 1995 Summer Universiade
Medalists at the 1995 Pan American Games
Medalists at the 1999 Pan American Games
Senators of the LVI Legislative Period of the National Congress of Chile
20th-century Chilean people
21st-century Chilean people